The 2003 NCAA Division I-AA football season, part of college football in the United States organized by the National Collegiate Athletic Association at the Division I-AA level, began in August 2003, and concluded with the 2003 NCAA Division I-AA Football Championship Game on December 19, 2003, at Finley Stadium in Chattanooga, Tennessee. The Delaware Fightin' Blue Hens won their first I-AA championship, defeating the Colgate Raiders by a final score of 40−0.

Conference changes and new programs

Conference standings

Conference champions

Postseason

NCAA Division I-AA playoff bracket
The top four teams in the tournament were seeded; seeded teams were assured of hosting games in the first two rounds.

* By team name denotes host institution

* By score denotes overtime period(s)

References